Christopher Ford may refer to:

Christopher Ford (screenwriter), American film screenwriter, producer, and actor
Christopher Ashley Ford (born 1967), American lawyer and government official 
Chris Ford (1949–2023), American basketball player and coach
Chris Ford (wrestler) or Crowbar (born 1974), American professional wrestler